Biju Kuttan (born 13 May 1976) is an Indian actor and comedian who appears in Malayalam films. As of June 2021, he has acted in more than 70 Malayalam films.

Biju Kuttan is born in North Paravur, Ernakulam . He completed most of his schooling from SNM HSS MOOTHAKUNNAM, Ernakulam  Biju is married to Subitha. The couple have two daughtersLakshmi and Parvathi.

Career

In 2006, he acted in a supporting role alongside Mammootty in the Malayalam film Pothen Vava. It was a comedic role. In the same year, he acted in another full-length comedy role in the Mohanlal starrer Chotta Mumbai, which gave a major breakthrough in his career.

Filmography

All films are in Malayalam language unless otherwise noted.

Television
Actor
Five Star Thattukada (Asianet)- 2005-2008
Savari Girigiri (Surya TV)- 2005
Ettu Sundarikalum Njanum (Surya TV)- 2006-2008
Veendum Chila Veetuviseshangal (Asianet)- 2007
Comedy stars season 2 (Asianet) as Host- 2018
Thattukada - Salt N Pepper (Kaumudy)- 2015
Comedy super nights  (Flowers TV -HD)  2018
Judge
Bhima Jewels Comedy Festival (Mazhavil Manorama)- 2014 
Comedy Utsavam (Flowers TV)- 2018
Comedy Stars (Asianet)- 2018
Minnum Tharam Season 2(Asianet)- 2021

References

External links
 
 
 
 

Male actors from Kochi
Living people
Male actors in Malayalam cinema
Indian male film actors
1973 births
21st-century Indian male actors
Indian male comedians
Indian male television actors
Male actors in Malayalam television